is an underground railway station in Miyagino-ku in Sendai, Miyagi, Japan operated by East Japan Railway Company (JR East).

Lines
Rikuzen-Haranomachi Station is served by the Senseki Line.

Station layout
The station is an underground station with two opposed side platforms. The station has a Midori no Madoguchi staffed ticket office.

Platforms

History
Rikuzen-Haranomachi opened on June 5, 1925 as a station on the Miyagi Electric Railway. The line was nationalized on May 1, 1944. The station was absorbed into the JR East network upon the privatization of JNR on April 1, 1987. The station was relocated underground in March 2000.

Passenger statistics
In fiscal 2018, the station was used by an average of 4,281 passengers daily (boarding passengers only).

Surrounding area
 
Miyagino Ward Office
East Sendai Police Office

See also
 List of railway stations in Japan

References

External links

  

Railway stations in Sendai
Senseki Line
Railway stations in Japan opened in 1925
Stations of East Japan Railway Company